Heinz Wehrli (born 24 June 1953) is a Swiss former equestrian. He competed in the team eventing at the 1996 Summer Olympics.

References

External links
 

1953 births
Living people
Swiss male equestrians
Olympic equestrians of Switzerland
Equestrians at the 1996 Summer Olympics
People from Winterthur District
Sportspeople from the canton of Zürich
20th-century Swiss people